Preachers' House (also House of Three Preachers; in Polish Dom Kaznodziei or Dom Trzech Kaznodziei) is a mannerist townhouse in Gdańsk, Poland. It is located on Katarzynki Street, in the centre of the historical Old Town.

History 
The house was constructed between 1599 and 1602 according to plans by a local architect Anthonis van Obberghen. Initially it housed rooms for the Lutheran clergy serving in the nearby St. Catherine's Church. The façade, one of the very few in the area to survive World War II, is divided into three distinct parts, which make the building look like three identical, yet separate town houses. This made the large building fit better with the surrounding narrow mediaeval town houses. It was a common feature of many of van Obberghen's projects, notably the Grand Armoury and the Green Gate. In front of the façade stands a characteristic gilded railing.

The three parts of the façade are tied together by an inscription in the German language running right below the tops, reading "DIE AVF DEN HERRN HARREN KRIEGEN NEVE KRAFT DASS SIE AVFFAHREN MIT FLVEGELN WIE ADLER".

On 27 February 1967 the building was listed in the cultural heritage register. It was fully restored and reconstructed in 1970. Currently it houses the Regional Endocrinological Health Centre.

References 

Buildings and structures in Gdańsk
Mannerist architecture in Poland